Võhma Air Base (also Vohma) is a former Soviet air base in Estonia located 4 km north of Võhma. It was dismantled towards the end of the Cold War.

References

Defunct airports in Estonia
Soviet Air Force bases